Francis J. McCarton (October 6, 1854 – June 17, 1907) was an American professional baseball player who played as an outfielder during the 1872 season for the Middletown Mansfields in the National Association.

References

External links

1854 births
1907 deaths
Major League Baseball outfielders
19th-century baseball players
Middletown Mansfields players
Baseball players from New York (state)
Burials at Calvary Cemetery (Queens)